William Smith Warner (February 1, 1817 – January 6, 1897) was a member of the Wisconsin State Assembly.

Biography
Warner was born on February 1, 1817, in Hector, New York. He settled in Appleton, Wisconsin, in 1849. He died in Fond du Lac on January 6, 1897.

Career
Warner was a member of the Assembly during the 1878 session. While a member, he was identified as an Independent Democrat. He was defeated for re-election as a Democratic candidate by John C. Petersen. Other positions Warner held include Postmaster, City Attorney and an alderman of Appleton, and justice of the peace.

References

Politicians from Appleton, Wisconsin
Members of the Wisconsin State Assembly
Wisconsin city council members
Wisconsin postmasters
American justices of the peace
Wisconsin Independents
Wisconsin Democrats
19th-century American politicians
1817 births
1897 deaths
19th-century American judges
19th-century American lawyers
Wisconsin city attorneys